Chamaecrista is a genus of flowering plants in the pea family, Fabaceae, subfamily Caesalpinioideae. Members of the genus are commonly known as sensitive pea. Several species are capable of rapid plant movement. Unlike the related genera Cassia and Senna, members of Chamaecrista form root nodules.

Species
Chamaecrista comprises the following species, organized into sections, subsections, and series:

Section Apoucouita Benth.

Series Apoucouita
 Chamaecrista aiarana (H.S.Irwin) H.S.Irwin & Barneby
 Chamaecrista apoucouita (Aubl.) H.S.Irwin & Barneby
 Chamaecrista aspidiifolia H.S.Irwin & Barneby
 Chamaecrista bahiae (H.S.Irwin) H.S.Irwin & Barneby
 Chamaecrista boyanii (H.S.Irwin & Barneby) H.S.Irwin
 Chamaecrista compitalis (H.S.Irwin & Barneby) H.S.Irwin
 Chamaecrista duartei (H.S.Irwin) H.S.Irwin & Barneby
 Chamaecrista eitenorum (H.S.Irwin & Barneby) H.S.Irwin
 var. eitenorum (H.S.Irwin & Barneby) H.S.Irwin
 var. regana (H.S.Irwin & Barneby) H.S.Irwin
 Chamaecrista ensiformis (Vell.) H.S.Irwin & Barneby
 var. ensiformis (Vell.) H.S.Irwin & Barneby
 var. maranonica (H.S.Irwin) H.S.Irwin & Barneby
 var. plurifoliolata (Hoehne) H.S.Irwin & Barneby
 Chamaecrista hymenaeifolia (Benth.) H.S.Irwin & Barneby
 Chamaecrista negrensis (H.S.Irwin) H.S.Irwin & Barneby
 var. albuquerquei (H.S.Irwin & Barneby) H.S.Irwin
 var. negrensis (H.S.Irwin) H.S.Irwin & Barneby
 Chamaecrista onusta H.S.Irwin & Barneby
 Chamaecrista polystachya (Benth.) H.S.Irwin & Barneby
 Chamaecrista scleroxylon (Ducke) H.S.Irwin & Barneby
 Chamaecrista subpeltata (Rizzini) H.S.Irwin & Barneby
 Chamaecrista xinguensis (Ducke) H.S.Irwin & Barneby

Series Pteridophyllae
 Chamaecrista adiantifolia (Spruce ex Benth.) H. S. Irwin & Barneby
 var. adiantifolia (Spruce ex Benth.) H. S. Irwin & Barneby
 var. pteridophylla (Sandwith) H.S.Irwin & Barneby
 Chamaecrista aspleniifolia (H.S.Irwin & Barneby) H.S.Irwin

Section Absus DC. ex Colladon emend. Irwin & Barneby
Subsection Absus DC. ex Colladon

Series Absoideae
 Chamaecrista acosmifolia (Benth.) H.S.Irwin & Barneby
 var. acosmifolia (Benth.) H.S.Irwin & Barneby
 var. euryloba (H.S.Irwin & Barneby) H.S.Irwin
 var. oropedii (H.S.Irwin & Barneby) H.S.Irwin
 Chamaecrista amiciella (H.S.Irwin & Barneby) H.S.Irwin
 Chamaecrista andersonii (H.S.Irwin & Barneby) H.S.Irwin
 Chamaecrista barbata (Nees & Mart.) H.S.Irwin & Barn
 Chamaecrista belemii (H.S.Irwin & Barneby) H.S.Irwin
 var. belemii (H.S.Irwin & Barneby) H.S.Irwin
 var. paludicola (H.S.Irwin & Barneby) H.S.Irwin
 Chamaecrista brevicalyx (Benth.) H.S.Irwin & Barneby
 var. brevicalyx (Benth.) H.S.Irwin & Barneby
 var. elliptica (H.S.Irwin & Barneby) H.S.Irwin
 Chamaecrista campestris H.S.Irwin & Barneby 
 Chamaecrista carobinha (H.S.Irwin & Barneby) H.S.Irwin
 Chamaecrista chapadae (H.S.Irwin & Barneby) H.S.Irwin
 Chamaecrista egleri (H.S.Irwin & Barneby) H.S.Irwin
 Chamaecrista fagonioides (Vogel) H.S.Irwin & Barneby
 var. fagonioides (Vogel) H.S.Irwin & Barneby
 var. macrocalyx (H.S.Irwin & Barneby) H.S.Irwin
 Chamaecrista hispidula (Vahl) H.S.Irwin & Barneby 
 Chamaecrista jacobinea (Benth.) H.S.Irwin & Barneby
 Chamaecrista juruenensis (Hoehne) H.S.Irwin & Barneby
 Chamaecrista longicuspis (Benth.) H.S.Irwin & Barneby
 Chamaecrista multiseta (Benth.) H.S.Irwin & Barneby
 Chamaecrista paraunana (H.S.Irwin & Barneby) H.S.Irwin
 Chamaecrista punctulata (Hook. & Arn.) H.S.Irwin & Barn
 Chamaecrista roncadorensis (H.S.Irwin & Barneby) H.S.Irwin
 Chamaecrista rugosula (Benth.) H.S.Irwin & Barneby
 Chamaecrista salvatoris (H.S.Irwin & Barneby) H.S.Irwin
 Chamaecrista souzana (H.S.Irwin & Barneby) H.S.Irwin
 Chamaecrista tetraphylla Britton & Rose
 Chamaecrista viscosa (Kunth) H.S.Irwin & Barneby
 var. major (Benth.) H.S.Irwin & Barneby
 var. paraguayensis (Chodat & Hassl.) H.S.Irwin & Barneby
 var. viscosa (Kunth) H.S.Irwin & Barneby
 Chamaecrista zygophylloides (Taub.) H.S.Irwin & Barneby
 var. caribaea (H.S.Irwin & Barneby) H.S.Irwin
 var. colligans (H.S.Irwin & Barneby) H.S.Irwin
 var. deamii (Britton & Rose) H.S.Irwin & Barneby
 var. zygophylloides (Taub.) H.S.Irwin & Barneby

Series Adenophyllae
 Chamaecrista adenophylla (Taub.) H.S.Irwin & Barneby
 Chamaecrista chrysosepala (H.S.Irwin & Barneby) H.S.Irwin
 Chamaecrista hatschbachii H.S.Irwin & Barneby
 Chamaecrista itabiritoana (H.S.Irwin & Barneby) H.S.Irwin

Series Andromedeae
 Chamaecrista andromedea (Benth.) H.S.Irwin & Barneby

Series Atroglandulosae
 Chamaecrista atroglandulosa (Harms) H.S.Irwin & Barneby

Series Bracteolatae
 Chamaecrista bracteolata (Vogel) H.S.Irwin & Barneby
 Chamaecrista glaziovii (Harms) H.S.Irwin & Barneby
 Chamaecrista phyllostachya (Benth.) H.S.Irwin & Barneby

Series Catharticae
 Chamaecrista cathartica (Mart.) H.S.Irwin & Barneby
 var. cathartica (Mart.) H.S.Irwin & Barneby
 var. paucijuga (H.S.Irwin & Barneby) H.S.Irwin
 Chamaecrista catharticoides (H.S.Irwin & Barneby) H.S.Irwin
 Chamaecrista microsenna (H.S.Irwin & Barneby) H.S.Irwin

Series Confertae
 Chamaecrista caespitosa (Benth.) H.S.Irwin & Barneby
 Chamaecrista conferta (Benth.) H.S.Irwin & Barneby
 var. conferta (Benth.) H.S.Irwin & Barneby
 var. machrisiana (Cowan) H.S.Irwin & Barneby
 var. simulans (H.S.Irwin & Barneby) H.S.Irwin
 var. virgata (H.S.Irwin & Barneby) H.S.Irwin
 Chamaecrista crommyotricha (Harms) H.S.Irwin & Barneby

Series Ericifoliae
 Chamaecrista ericifolia (Benth.) H.S.Irwin & Barneby

Series Geminatae
 Chamaecrista didyma H.S.Irwin & Barneby
 Chamaecrista geminata (Benth.) H.S.Irwin & Barneby

Series Glutinosae
 Chamaecrista caracensis (H.S.Irwin & Barneby) H.S.Irwin
 Chamaecrista catiarae (H.S.Irwin & Barneby) H.S.Irwin
 Chamaecrista dentata (Vogel) H.S.Irwin & Barneby
 Chamaecrista echinocarpa (Benth.) H.S.Irwin & Barneby
 Chamaecrista fragilis (H.S.Irwin & Barneby) H.S.Irwin
 Chamaecrista kirkbridei (H.S.Irwin & Barneby) H.S.Irwin
 Chamaecrista lentiscifolia (Benth.) H.S.Irwin & Barneby
 Chamaecrista myrophenges (H.S.Irwin & Barneby) H.S.Irwin
 Chamaecrista punctulifera (Harms) H.S.Irwin & Barneby
 Chamaecrista semaphora (H.S.Irwin & Barneby) H.S.Irwin
 Chamaecrista stillifera (H.S.Irwin & Barneby) H.S.Irwin

Series Gracillimae
 Chamaecrista benthamii (Ghesq.) H.S.Irwin & Barneby

Series Hassleranae
 Chamaecrista hassleri (H.S.Irwin & Barneby) H.S.Irwin

Series Hedysaroides
 Chamaecrista hedysaroides (Vogel) H.S.Irwin & Barneby

Series Incanae
 Chamaecrista incana (Vogel) H.S.Irwin & Barneby

Series Incurvatae
 Chamaecrista incurvata (Benth.) H.S.Irwin & Barneby
 var. incurvata (Benth.) H.S.Irwin & Barneby
 var. zanclodes (H.S.Irwin & Barneby) H.S.Irwin
 Chamaecrista lavradioides (Benth.) H.S.Irwin & Barneby
 Chamaecrista linearifolia (G.Don) H.S.Irwin & Barneby
 var. bradei (Harms) H.S.Irwin & Barneby
 var. linearifolia (G.Don) H.S.Irwin & Barneby
 Chamaecrista planifolia (H.S.Irwin & Barneby) H.S.Irwin

Series Lomatopodae
 Chamaecrista lomatopoda (Benth.) H.S.Irwin & Barneby

Series Lucidae
 Chamaecrista amambaya (H.S.Irwin & Barneby) H.S.Irwin
 Chamaecrista caiapo (H.S.Irwin & Barneby) H.S.Irwin
 Chamaecrista labouriaeae (H.S.Irwin & Barneby) H.S.Irwin
 Chamaecrista lamprosperma (Benth.) H.S.Irwin & Barneby
 Chamaecrista seticrenata (H.S.Irwin & Barneby) H.S.Irwin

Series Microphyllae
 Chamaecrista adenophora (Harms) H.S.Irwin & Barneby
 Chamaecrista cristalinae (H.S.Irwin & Barneby) H.S.Irwin
 Chamaecrista dalbergiifolia (Benth.) H.S.Irwin & Barneby
 Chamaecrista decrescens (Benth.) H.S.Irwin & Barneby
 Chamaecrista dumalis (Hoehne) H.S.Irwin & Barneby
 Chamaecrista elachistophylla (Harms) H.S.Irwin & Barneby
 Chamaecrista foederalis (H.S.Irwin & Barneby) H.S.Irwin
 Chamaecrista harmsiana H.S.Irwin & Barneby 
 Chamaecrista huntii (H.S.Irwin & Barneby) H.S.Irwin
 Chamaecrista imbricans (H.S.Irwin & Barneby) H.S.Irwin
 Chamaecrista isidorea (Benth.) H.S.Irwin & Barneby
 Chamaecrista neesiana (Benth.) H.S.Irwin & Barneby
 var. goyazensis (Taub.) H.S.Irwin & Barneby
 var. laxiracemosa (Harms) H.S.Irwin & Barneby
 var. neesiana (Benth.) H.S.Irwin & Barneby
 var. subnitida (Taub.) H.S.Irwin & Barneby
 Chamaecrista nuda (H.S.Irwin & Barneby) H.S.Irwin
 var. correntina (H.S.Irwin & Barneby) H.S.Irwin
 var. huntii (H.S.Irwin & Barneby) H.S.Irwin
 Chamaecrista pohliana (Benth.) H.S.Irwin & Barneby
 Chamaecrista polymorpha (Harms) H.S.Irwin & Barneby
 Chamaecrista psoraleopsis (H.S.Irwin & Barneby) H.S.Irwin
 Chamaecrista sincorana (Harms) H.S.Irwin & Barneby
 Chamaecrista subdecrescens (H.S.Irwin & Barneby) H.S.Irwin

Series Nigricantes
 Chamaecrista calixtana (H.S.Irwin & Barneby) H.S.Irwin
 Chamaecrista fodinarum H.S.Irwin & Barneby
 Chamaecrista gilliesii (Harms) H.S.Irwin & Barneby
 Chamaecrista glischrodes H.S.Irwin & Barneby
 Chamaecrista itambana (Benth.) H.S.Irwin & Barneby

 Chamaecrista lavradiiflora (Harms) H.S.Irwin & Barneby
 Chamaecrista machaeriifolia (Benth.) H.S.Irwin & Barneby
 Chamaecrista philippi (H.S.Irwin & Barneby) H.S.Irwin
 Chamaecrista pilicarpa (Harms) H.S.Irwin & Barneby
 Chamaecrista sophoroides (Benth.) H.S.Irwin & Barneby
 Chamaecrista tephrosiifolia (Benth.) H.S.Irwin & Barneby
 Chamaecrista urophyllidia (H.S.Irwin & Barneby) H.S.Irwin

Series Ochnaceae
 Chamaecrista bifoliola (Harms) H.S.Irwin & Barneby
 Chamaecrista cotinifolia (G.Don) H.S.Irwin & Barneby
 var. cotinifolia (G.Don) H.S.Irwin & Barneby
 var. glaberrima (H.S.Irwin & Barneby) H.S.Irwin
 var. leptodictya (H.S.Irwin & Barneby) H.S.Irwin
 var. percoriacea (H.S.Irwin & Barneby) H.S.Irwin
 Chamaecrista crenulata (Benth.) H.S.Irwin & Barneby
 Chamaecrista desertorum (Benth.) H.S.Irwin & Barneby
 Chamaecrista geraldii (H.S.Irwin & Barneby) H.S.Irwin
 Chamaecrista ochnacea (Vogel) H.S.Irwin & Barneby
 var. latifolia (Benth.) H.S.Irwin & Barneby
 var. mollis (H.S.Irwin & Barneby) H.S.Irwin
 var. ochnacea (Vogel) H.S.Irwin & Barneby
 var. purpurascens (Benth.) H.S.Irwin & Barneby
 var. speluncae (H.S.Irwin & Barneby) H.S.Irwin
 Chamaecrista punctata (Vogel) H.S.Irwin & Barneby
 Chamaecrista vauthieri (Benth.) H.S.Irwin & Barneby

Series Oligospermae
 Chamaecrista oligosperma (Benth.) H.S.Irwin & Barneby

Series Paniculatae
 Chamaecrista celiae (H.S.Irwin & Barneby) H.S.Irwin
 Chamaecrista claussenii (Benth.) H.S.Irwin & Barneby
 var. claussenii (Benth.) H.S.Irwin & Barneby
 var. cyclophylla (H.S.Irwin & Barneby) H.S.Irwin
 var. megacycla (H.S.Irwin & Barneby) H.S.Irwin
 Chamaecrista lundii (Benth.) H.S.Irwin & Barneby
 Chamaecrista orbiculata (Benth.) H.S.Irwin & Barneby
 var. cercidifolia (H.S.Irwin & Barneby) H.S.Irwin
 var. orbiculata (Benth.) H.S.Irwin & Barneby
 var. trichothyrsus (Harms) H.S.Irwin & Barneby
 var. ustulata (H.S.Irwin & Barneby) H.S.Irwin
 Chamaecrista pachyclada (Harms) H.S.Irwin & Barneby
 Chamaecrista rigidifolia (Benth.) H.S.Irwin & Barneby
 var. rigidifolia (Benth.) H.S.Irwin & Barneby
 var. veadeirana (H.S.Irwin & Barneby) H.S.Irwin

Series Pinifoliae
 Chamaecrista paniculata (Benth.) H.S.Irwin & Barneby

Series Rigidulae
 Chamaecrista altoana (H.S.Irwin & Barneby) H.S.Irwin
 Chamaecrista azulana (H.S.Irwin & Barneby) H.S.Irwin
 Chamaecrista benthamiana (Harms) H.S.Irwin & Barneby
 Chamaecrista brachyblepharis (Harms) H.S.Irwin & Barneby
 Chamaecrista brachyrachis (Harms) H.S.Irwin & Barneby
 Chamaecrista chaetostegia (H.S.Irwin & Barneby) H.S.Irwin
 var. chaetostegia (H.S.Irwin & Barneby) H.S.Irwin
 var. obolaria (H.S.Irwin & Barneby) H.S.Irwin
 Chamaecrista ciliolata (Benth.) H.S.Irwin & Barneby
 var. caprina (H.S.Irwin & Barneby) H.S.Irwin
 var. ciliolata (Benth.) H.S.Irwin & Barneby
 var. pulchella (H.S.Irwin & Barneby) H.S.Irwin
 Chamaecrista cipoana (H.S.Irwin & Barneby) H.S.Irwin
 Chamaecrista dawsonii (Cowan) H.S.Irwin & Barneby
 Chamaecrista decumbens (Benth.) H.S.Irwin & Barneby
 Chamaecrista densifolia (Benth.) H.S.Irwin & Barneby
 Chamaecrista feliciana (H.S.Irwin & Barneby) H.S.Irwin
 Chamaecrista filicifolia (Benth.) H.S.Irwin & Barneby
 Chamaecrista glaucofilix (H.S.Irwin & Barneby) H.S.Irwin
 Chamaecrista gymnothyrsa (H.S.Irwin & Barneby) H.S.Irwin
 Chamaecrista macedoi (H.S.Irwin & Barneby) H.S.Irwin
 Chamaecrista mollicaulis (Harms) H.S.Irwin & Barneby
 Chamaecrista multipennis (H.S.Irwin & Barneby) H.S.Irwin
 Chamaecrista nanodes (H.S.Irwin & Barneby) H.S.Irwin
 Chamaecrista nummulariifolia (Benth.) H.S.Irwin & Barneby
 Chamaecrista planaltoana (Harms) H.S.Irwin & Barneby
 Chamaecrista polita (H.S.Irwin & Barneby) H.S.Irwin
 Chamaecrista strictula (H.S.Irwin & Barneby) H.S.Irwin

As traditionally circumscribed here, Chamaecrista ser. Rigidulae is polyphyletic. However, the series is monophyletic if redefined to exclude C. brachyblepharis and C. ciliolata and include C. sincorana and C. botryoides (from series Microphyllae). The species in the series are all endemic to Brazil and can be divided geographically into two main lineages, one from  the highlands of Goiás, and the second from the Espinhaço Range of Bahia and Minas Gerais. 

Series Secundae
 Chamaecrista secunda (Benth.) H.S.Irwin & Barneby

Series Setosae
 Chamaecrista amphibola (H.S.Irwin & Barneby) H.S.Irwin
 Chamaecrista auris-zerdae (H.S.Irwin & Barneby) H.S.Irwin
 Chamaecrista campicola (Harms) H.S.Irwin & Barneby
 Chamaecrista obtecta (Benth.) H.S.Irwin & Barneby
 Chamaecrista ochrosperma (H.S.Irwin & Barneby) H.S.Irwin
 Chamaecrista orenocensis (Benth.) H.S.Irwin & Barneby
 Chamaecrista scabra (Benth.) H.S.Irwin & Barneby
 Chamaecrista setosa (Vogel) H.S.Irwin & Barneby
 var. detonsa (Benth.) H.S.Irwin & Barneby
 var. paucivenia (H.S.Irwin & Barneby) H.S.Irwin
 var. setosa (Vogel) H.S.Irwin & Barneby
 var. subsetosa (Malme) H.S.Irwin & Barneby

Series Spinulosae
 Chamaecrista spinulosa (H.S.Irwin & Barneby) H.S.Irwin

Series Strictifoliae
 Chamaecrista strictifolia (Benth.) H.S.Irwin & Barneby

Series Trachycarpae
 Chamaecrista cavalcantina (H.S.Irwin & Barneby) H.S.Irwin
 Chamaecrista trachycarpa (Vogel) H.S.Irwin & Barneby
 var. acutifolia (Benth.) H.S.Irwin & Barneby
 var. trachycarpa (Vogel) H.S.Irwin & Barneby
 Chamaecrista venatoria (H.S.Irwin & Barneby) H.S.Irwin

Series Unijugae
 Chamaecrista catapodia (H.S.Irwin & Barneby) H.S.Irwin
 Chamaecrista monticola (Benth.) H.S.Irwin & Barneby

Series Ursinae
 Chamaecrista adamantina (H.S.Irwin & Barneby) H.S.Irwin
 Chamaecrista astrochiton (H.S.Irwin & Barneby) H.S.Irwin
 Chamaecrista aurivilla (Benth.) H.S.Irwin & Barneby
 Chamaecrista centiflora (H.S.Irwin & Barneby) H.S.Irwin
 Chamaecrista exsudans (Benth.) H.S.Irwin & Barneby
 Chamaecrista fuscescens (Benth.) H.S.Irwin & Barneby
 Chamaecrista ixodes (H.S.Irwin & Barneby) H.S.Irwin
 Chamaecrista leucopilis (Harms) H.S.Irwin & Barneby
 Chamaecrista ursina (Benth.) H.S.Irwin & Barneby
 Chamaecrista virginis (H.S.Irwin & Barneby) H.S.Irwin
 Chamaecrista xanthadena (Benth.) H.S.Irwin & Barneby

Subsection Adenophyllum Irwin & Barneby
 Chamaecrista bucherae (Moldenke) H.S.Irwin & Barneby (Cuba)

Subsection Baseophyllum (Colladon) Irwin & Barneby

 Chamaecrista coriacea (Benth.) H.S.Irwin & Barneby
 Chamaecrista cytisoides (DC. ex Collad.) H. S. Irwin & Barneby
 var. blanchetii (Benth.) H.S.Irwin & Barneby
 var. brachystachya (Benth.) H.S.Irwin & Barneby
 var. confertiformis (H.S.Irwin & Barneby) H.S.Irwin
 var. cytisoides (DC. ex Collad.) H. S. Irwin & Barneby
 var. decora (H.S.Irwin & Barneby) H.S.Irwin
 var. micrantha (H.S.Irwin & Barneby) H.S.Irwin
 var. unijuga (Benth.) H.S.Irwin & Barneby

Subsection Otophyllum Irwin & Barneby
 Chamaecrista debilis (Vogel) H.S.Irwin & Barneby

Section Caliciopsis Irwin & Barneby
 Chamaecrista calycioides (DC. ex Collad.) Greene
 Chamaecrista duckeana (P.Bezerra & Alf.Fern.) H.S.Irwin

Section Chamaecrista Moench

Series Bauhinianae (Colladon) Irwin & Barneby
 Chamaecrista basifolia (Vogel) H.S.Irwin & Barneby

 Chamaecrista rotundifolia (Pers.) Greene
 var. rotundifolia (Pers.) Greene
 var. grandiflora (Benth.) H.S.Irwin & Barneby

Series Chamaecrista Moench

 Chamaecrista chamaecristoides (Collad.) Greene
 var. brandegeei (Britton & Rose) H.S.Irwin & Barneby
 var. chamaecristoides (Collad.) Greene
 var. cruziana (Britton & Rose) H.S.Irwin & Barneby

 Chamaecrista cuprea H.S.Irwin & Barneby
 Chamaecrista deeringiana Small & Pennell
 Chamaecrista fasciculata (Michx.) Greene—Showy Partridge Pea

 Chamaecrista glandulosa (L.) Greene—Jamaican Broom
 var. andicola H.S.Irwin & Barneby
 var. andreana (Britton & Killip) H.S.Irwin & Barneby
 var. brasiliensis (Vogel) H.S.Irwin & Barneby
 var. flavicoma (Kunth) H.S.Irwin & Barneby
 var. glandulosa (L.) Greene
 var. mirabilis (Pollard) H.S.Irwin & Barneby
 var. parralensis (H.S.Irwin & Barneby) H.S.Irwin
 var. picardae (Urb.) H.S.Irwin & Barneby
 var. swartzii (Wikstr.) H.S.Irwin & Barneby
 var. tristicula (Kunth) H.S.Irwin & Barneby

 Chamaecrista lineata (Sw.) Greene
 var. brachyloba (Griseb.) H.S.Irwin & Barneby
 var. brevipila (Urb.) H.S.Irwin & Barneby
 var. jamaicensis (Britton) H.S.Irwin & Barneby
 var. keyensis (Pennell) H.S.Irwin & Barneby
 var. lineata (Sw.) Greene
 var. pinoi (Britton & Rose) H.S.Irwin & Barneby

 Chamaecrista mimosoides (L.) Greene

 Chamaecrista nictitans (L.) Moench
 subsp. brachypoda (Benth.) H.S.Irwin & Barneby
 subsp. disadena (Steud.) H.S.Irwin & Barneby
 subsp. nictitans (L.) Moench
 subsp. patellaria (Collad.) H.S.Irwin & Barneby
 var. aspera (Elliott) Torr. & A.Gray
 var. diffusa (DC.) H.S. Irwin & Barneby
 var. glabrata (Vogel) H.S. Irwin & Barneby
 var. jaliscensis (Greenm.) H.S. Irwin & Barneby
 var. mensalis (Greenm.) H.S.Irwin & Barneby
 var. pilosa (Benth.) H.S. Irwin & Barneby
 var. praetexta (Vogel) H.S. Irwin & Barneby
 Chamaecrista obcordata (Sw.) Britton
 Chamaecrista pascuorum (Benth.) H.S.Irwin & Barneby

 Chamaecrista pedemontana H.S.Irwin & Barneby
 Chamaecrista pedicellaris (DC.) Britton
 var. adenosperma (Urb.) H.S.Irwin & Barneby
 var. pedicellaris (DC.) Britton
 Chamaecrista portoricensis (Urb.) O.F.Cook & G.N.Collins
 Chamaecrista pygmaea (DC.) Britton
 var. pygmaea (DC.) Britton
 var. savannarum (Britton) H.S.Irwin & Barneby
 Chamaecrista repens (Vogel) H.S.Irwin & Barneby
 var. multijuga (Benth.) H.S.Irwin & Barneby
 var. repens (Vogel) H.S.Irwin & Barneby

 Chamaecrista rufa (M.Martens & Galeotti) Britton

 Chamaecrista venturiana H.S.Irwin & Barneby
 Chamaecrista vestita (Vogel) H.S.Irwin & Barneby

Series Coriaceae (Bentham) Irwin & Barneby
 Chamaecrista anceps (Benth.) H.S.Irwin & Barneby
 Chamaecrista aristata (Benth.) H.S.Irwin & Barneby
 Chamaecrista burchellii (Benth.) H.S.Irwin & Barneby
 Chamaecrista cardiostegia H.S.Irwin & Barneby
 Chamaecrista caribaea (Northr.) Britton
 var. caribaea (Northr.) Britton
 var. inaguensis (Britton) H.S.Irwin & Barneby
 var. lucayana (Britton) H.S.Irwin & Barneby
 Chamaecrista choriophylla (Vogel) H.S.Irwin & Barneby
 var. choriophylla (Vogel) H.S.Irwin & Barneby
 var. latifolia (Benth.) H.S.Irwin & Barneby 
 var. rossicorum H.S.Irwin & Barneby
 Chamaecrista cinerascens (Vogel) H.S.Irwin & Barneby
 Chamaecrista distichoclada (Benth.) H.S.Irwin & Barneby
 Chamaecrista lagotois H.S.Irwin & Barneby
 Chamaecrista mucronata (Spreng.) H.S.Irwin & Barneby
 Chamaecrista multinervia (Benth.) H.S.Irwin & Barneby
 Chamaecrista olesiphylla (Vogel) H.S.Irwin & Barneby
 Chamaecrista papillata H.S.Irwin & Barneby
 Chamaecrista potentilla (Benth.) H.S.Irwin & Barneby
 Chamaecrista roraimae (Benth.) Gleason
 Chamaecrista rotundata (Vogel) H.S.Irwin & Barneby
 var. rotundata (Vogel) H.S.Irwin & Barneby
 var. grandistipula (Vogel) H.S.Irwin & Barneby
 Chamaecrista simplifacta H.S.Irwin & Barneby
 Chamaecrista tragacanthoides (Benth.) H.S.Irwin & Barneby
 var. rasa H.S.Irwin & Barneby
 var. tragacanthoides (Benth.) H.S.Irwin & Barneby
 Chamaecrista ulmea H.S.Irwin & Barneby
 Chamaecrista venulosa (Benth.) H.S.Irwin & Barneby

Series Flexuosae Irwin & Barneby
 Chamaecrista flexuosa (L.) Greene
 var. flexuosa (L.) Greene
 var. texana (Buckley) H.S.Irwin & Barneby
 Chamaecrista gononclada (Benth.) H.S.Irwin & Barneby
 Chamaecrista parvistipula (Benth.) H.S.Irwin & Barneby
 Chamaecrista swainsonii (Benth.) H.S.Irwin & Barneby

Series Greggianae Irwin & Barneby
 Chamaecrista greggii (A. Gray) Pollard ex A. H. Heller
 var. greggii (A. Gray) Pollard ex A. H. Heller
 var. macdougaliana (Rose) H.S.Irwin & Barneby
 var. potosina (Britton & Rose) H.S.Irwin & Barneby

Series Prostratae (Bentham) Irwin & Bameby
 Chamaecrista cordistipula (Mart.) H.S.Irwin & Barneby

 Chamaecrista kunthiana (Schltdl. & Cham.) H. S. Irwin & Barneby

 Chamaecrista pilosa (L.) Greene
 var. luxurians (Benth.) H.S.Irwin & Barneby
 var. pilosa (L.) Greene
 Chamaecrista serpens (L.) Greene
 var. delicata (Britton & Rose) H.S.Irwin & Barneby
 var. grandiflora (Benth.) H.S.Irwin & Barneby
 var. mensarum (A.R.Molina) H.S.Irwin & Barneb
 var. serpens (L.) Greene
 var. wrightii (A.Gray) H.S.Irwin & Barneby
 Chamaecrista supplex (Benth.) Britton & Killip
 Chamaecrista tenuisepala (Benth.) H.S.Irwin & Barneby
 Chamaecrista trichopoda (Benth.) Britton & Killip

Section Grimaldia (Schrank) Irwin & Barneby
 Chamaecrista absus (L.) H.S.Irwin & Barneby
 var. absus (L.) H.S.Irwin & Barneby
 var. meonandra (H.S.Irwin & Barneby) H.S.Irwin

Section Xerocalyx (Bentham) Irwin & Barneby

 Chamaecrista desvauxii (Collad.) Killip
 var. brevipes (Benth.) H.S.Irwin & Barneby
 var. desvauxii (Collad.) Killip
 var. langsdorffii (Kunth ex Vogel) H.S.Irwin & Barneby
 var. latifolia (Benth.) H.S.Irwin & Barneby
 var. latistipula (Benth.) G.P.Lewis
 var. linearis (H.S.Irwin) H.S.Irwin & Barneby
 var. malacophylla (Vogel) H.S.Irwin & Barneby
 var. mollissima (Benth.) H.S.Irwin & Barneby
 var. pirebebuiensis (Chodat & Hassl.) H.S.Irwin & Barneby
 var. saxatilis (Amshoff) H.S.Irwin & Barneby
 var. triumviralis H.S.Irwin & Barneby
 Chamaecrista diphylla (L.) Greene

 Chamaecrista ramosa (Vogel) H.S.Irwin & Barneby
 var. curvifolia (Vogel) G.P.Lewis
 var. erythrocalyx (Benth.) H.S.Irwin & Barneby
 var. lucida (Benth.) H.S.Irwin & Barneby
 var. parvifoliola (H.S.Irwin) H.S.Irwin & Barneby
 var. ramosa (Vogel) H.S.Irwin & Barneby
 var. ventuarensis (H.S.Irwin) H.S.Irwin & Barneby

Incertae Sedis

 Chamaecrista africana (Steyaert) Lock
 Chamaecrista aldabrensis (Hemsl.) F. Friedmann
 Chamaecrista amabilis H.S.Irwin & Barneby
 Chamaecrista amorimii Barneby
 Chamaecrista anamariae Conc., L.P. Queiroz & G.P. Lewis
 Chamaecrista angustissima (Lam.) Greene
 Chamaecrista ankaratrensis (R.Vig.) Du Puy
 Chamaecrista arachiphylla Barneby
 Chamaecrista arboae Barneby
 Chamaecrista arenicola (R.Vig.) Du Puy
 var. arenicola (R.Vig.) Du Puy
 var. dunensis (R.Vig.) Du Puy
 Chamaecrista auricoma (Benth.) V.Singh
 Chamaecrista axilliflora H.S.Irwin & Barneby
 Chamaecrista biensis (Steyaert) Lock
 Chamaecrista botryoides Conc., L.P. Queiroz & G.P. Lewis
 Chamaecrista brevifolia (Lam.) Greene
 var. brevifolia (Lam.) Greene
 var. glabra (Brenan) Du Puy
 Chamaecrista capensis (Thunb.) E.Mey.
 Chamaecrista caspariifolia Barneby
 Chamaecrista catolesensis Conc., L.P. Queiroz & G.P. Lewis
 Chamaecrista chiquitana Barneby
 Chamaecrista comosa E.Mey.
 var. comosa E.Mey.
 var. capricornia (Steyaert) Lock
 Chamaecrista concinna (Benth.) Pedley
 Chamaecrista coradinii H.S. Irwin & Barneby
 Chamaecrista decora (H. S. Irwin & Barneby) Conc. et al.
 Chamaecrista deltoidea Hervencio & L.P. Queiroz
 Chamaecrista depauperata Conc., L.P. Queiroz & G.P. Lewis
 Chamaecrista dimidiata (Buch.-Ham. ex Roxb.) Lock
 Chamaecrista duboisii (Steyaert) Lock
 Chamaecrista dumaziana (Brenan) Du Puy
 Chamaecrista dunensis Thulin
 Chamaecrista exilis (Vatke) Lock
 Chamaecrista fagifolia Bertol 
 Chamaecrista falcinella (Oliv.) Lock 
 var. falcinella (Oliv.) Lock
 var. intermedia (Brenan) Lock
 var. parviflora (Steyaert) Lock
 Chamaecrista fallacina (Chiov.) Lock
 Chamaecrista fenarolii (Mendonca & Torre) Lock
 Chamaecrista fulgida Barneby
 Chamaecrista garambiensis (Hosokawa) H.Ohashi, Tateshi & Nemoto
 Chamaecrista ghesquiereana (Brenan) Lock
 Chamaecrista gracilior (Ghesq.) Lock
 Chamaecrista grantii (Oliv.) Standl.
 Chamaecrista gumminans H.S.Irwin & Barneby
 Chamaecrista harneyi (Specht) Govaerts
 Chamaecrista hecatophylla (DC.) Greene
 Chamaecrista hildebrandtii (Vatke) Lock
 Chamaecrista huillensis (Mendonca & Torre) Lock
 Chamaecrista jaegeri (Keay) Lock
 Chamaecrista kalulensis (Steyaert) Lock
 Chamaecrista katangensis (Ghesq.) Lock
 var. katangensis (Ghesq.) Lock
 var. nuda (Steyaert) Lock
 Chamaecrista kirkii (Oliv.) Standl.
 var. glabra (Steyaert) Lock
 var. kirkii (Oliv.) Standl.
 var. guineensis (Steyaert) Lock
 Chamaecrista kleinii (Wight & Arn.) V.Singh
 Chamaecrista kolabensis ("Kothari, Moorthy & M.P.Nayar") V.Singh
 Chamaecrista lateriticola (R.Vig.) Du Puy
 Chamaecrista leptocarpa Benth. 
 Chamaecrista leschenaultiana (DC.) O. Deg.
 Chamaecrista longipes (Domin) Pedley 
 Chamaecrista meelii (Steyaert) Lock
 Chamaecrista mindanaensis (Merr.) K.Larsen
 Chamaecrista newtonii (Mendonca & Torre) Lock
 Chamaecrista nigricans (Vahl) Greene
 Chamaecrista nilgirica (V.Singh) V.Singh
 Chamaecrista nomame (Sieber) H.Ohashi
 Chamaecrista paralias (Brenan) Lock
 Chamaecrista parva (Steyaert) Lock
 Chamaecrista plumosa E.Mey.
 var. erecta (Schorn & Gordon-Gray) Lock
 var. plumosa E.Mey.
 Chamaecrista polytricha (Brenan) Lock
 var. pauciflora (Brenan) Lock
 var. polytricha (Brenan) Lock
 var. pulchella (Brenan) Lock
 Chamaecrista pratensis (R.Vig.) Du Puy
 Chamaecrista pteropoda Barneby
 Chamaecrista puccioniana (Chiov.) Lock
 Chamaecrista pumila (Lam.) K.Larsen 
 Chamaecrista reducta (Brenan) Du Puy
 Chamaecrista robynsiana (Ghesq.) Lock
 Chamaecrista rupestrium H.S.Irwin & Barneby
 Chamaecrista schmitzii (Steyaert) Lock
 Chamaecrista speciosa Conc., L.P. Queiroz & G.P. Lewis
 Chamaecrista stricta E.Mey.
 Chamaecrista tagera (L.) Standl.
 Chamaecrista telfairiana (Hook.f.) Lock
 Chamaecrista usambarensis (Taub.) Standl.
 Chamaecrista verruculosa Afr.Fern. & E.P. Nunes
 Chamaecrista wallichiana (DC.) V.Singh
 Chamaecrista wittei (Ghesq.) Lock
 Chamaecrista zambesica (Oliv.) Lock

Species names with uncertain taxonomic status
The status of the following species is unresolved:

 Chamaecrista bella Conc., L.P.Queiroz & G.P.Lewis
 Chamaecrista biddulphiana Pedley
 Chamaecrista bissei A.Barreto & Yakovlev
 Chamaecrista ×blanchetiformis Conc., L.P.Queiroz & Borba
 Chamaecrista blanchetii (Benth.) Conc., L.P.Queiroz & G.P.Lewis
 Chamaecrista burmanni Eckl. & Zeyh.
 Chamaecrista commixta auct.
 Chamaecrista cupeyalensis A.Barreto & Yakovlev
 Chamaecrista deserti Pedley
 Chamaecrista exigua Pedley
 Chamaecrista falcifoliolata A.Barreto & Yakovlev
 Chamaecrista grisea Pedley
 Chamaecrista guanensis A.Barreto & Yakovlev
 Chamaecrista macambensis A.Barreto & Yakovlev
 Chamaecrista maritima Pedley
 Chamaecrista moorei Pedley
 Chamaecrista mwangokae Gereau & G.M.Walters
 Chamaecrista nana Conc., L.P.Queiroz & G.P.Lewis
 Chamaecrista ×patyensis Conc., L.P.Queiroz & Borba
 Chamaecrista rusbyi Britton & Rose ex Pittier
 Chamaecrista symonii Pedley
 Chamaecrista takhtajanii A.Barreto & Yakovlev
 Chamaecrista vestita (Vogel) Govaerts
 Chamaecrista xanthadena (Mart. ex Benth.) Govaerts

References

External links
 
 

 
Fabaceae genera
Cassieae